Hyatts is an unincorporated community in Delaware County, in the U.S. state of Ohio.

History
The community was platted in 1876 by Henry A. Hyatt, and named for him. Former variant names include Hyatt's, Hyatts Station, Hyattsville, Hyattville, Hyatville, and Hytts. A post office called Hyattville was established in 1877, and remained in operation until 1908.

References

Unincorporated communities in Delaware County, Ohio
Unincorporated communities in Ohio